It is recorded that Kilnam Chon played a major role in the introduction of the Internet to South Korea.
Kilnam Chon said in an interview that in 1982 he started a South Korean network development project.
The first Internet message sent from South Korea to the world was done by Hyunje Park in 1990.
It is recorded that the e-mail—"I am Hyunje Park from Korea. Anyone who sees this e-mail, please reply."—sent by Hyunje Park received a reply—"I am Torben at the University of Hawaiʻi, United States. Congratulations. You are now connected to the Internet."—soon after.

About 46 million people in South Korea (or 95.1% of the population) use the Internet. The country has the world's fastest average internet connection speed. South Korea has consistently ranked first in the UN ICT Development Index since the index's launch. The government established policies and programs that facilitated the rapid expansion and use of broadband. The country has 97.6% of the population owning a smartphone, which is the highest in the world.

National program
South Korea has the most DSL connections per capita worldwide. ADSL is standard, but VDSL has started growing quickly. ADSL commonly offers speeds of 3 Mbit/s to 8 Mbit/s, with VDSL accordingly faster. The large proportion of South Korea's population living in apartment blocks helps the spread of DSL, as does a high penetration of consumer electronics in general. Many apartment buildings in built-up metropolitan areas have speeds of up to 100 Mbit/s such as the capital Seoul and Incheon. VDSL is commonly found in newer apartments while ADSL is normally found in landed properties where the telephone exchange is far away.

The Internet has a higher status for many Koreans than it does in the West and the government actively supports this. According to the Information Technology and Innovation Foundation, South Korea's internet is the most developed in the world. Seoul has been called "the bandwidth capital of the world".

ISP and IDC 
There are three major ISPs: KT Corporation, SK Broadband (previously Hanaro Telecom), and LG Uplus (previously Powercomm and DACOM). They provide broadband and Internet circuit including Ethernet and operating Internet data centers in Seoul. Major MSOs are LG Hellovision, SK Broadband Cable , DLIVE, HCN and CMB.

Internet speed 
As of 2017, South Korea had the fastest average internet connection in the world at 28.6 Mbit/s, according to the report State of the Internet published by Akamai Technologies. South Korea's speed is four times faster than the world average of 7.0 Mbit/s. It is important to note that 100 Mbit/s services are the average standard in urban South Korean homes and the country is rapidly rolling out 1Gbit/s connections or 1,024 Mbit/s, at $20 per month, which is roughly 142 times as fast as the world average and 79 times as fast as the average speed in the United States.

Wireless broadband 
South Korea has pulled ahead of every other country when it comes to broadband Internet in all categories including Speed and Quality, Adoption, Price, and Literacy according to Internet Monitor. As many large, powerful countries begin to fall behind broadband experts look to South Korea for solutions. However, there are multiple reasons why South Korea's broadband is successful, such as, “Government planning, healthy competition, urban population density, private-sector growth, and Korean culture”, which have made it difficult for other countries to mimic their success.

Real name policy
There is a government-level proposal to stamp out anonymity in the South Korean internet environment. The Korea Communications Commission is considering this proposal.

Network Fee policy 
The government is considering to pass a bill, wherein online services (e.g. Netflix, Youtube) will have to pay a 'Network Fee' to ISPs depending on how much internet traffic they generate. It is supposed to compensate ISPs for the increased maintenance costs due to increased internet usage. This bill will also infringe upon Net Neutrality.

Cyberculture 

Cyberculture or internet culture is the cultural processes, products, or story of the culture in cyberspace. Cyberculture is referred to as technoculture, internet culture, post-human culture, and high tech culture. This confusing terminology demonstrates the diversity of cyberculture. In reality, cyberculture is designated as a virtual community culture, acting as an identity of online communication, and cyberpunk. Cyberculture in South Korea is more like a virtual community culture than anything else.

Cyberculture is prolific in South Korea, both in streams and in internet communities. South Korea's cyberculture is quite aggressive because of anonymity and trolls. To prevent this from getting worse, the South Korean government decided to regulate streaming platforms, especially Afreeca TV, which has become a controversy as to whether it corrupts cyberculture or not.

Cyberculture development in South Korea

Streaming Platforms 
Many cyberculture are produced on internet streams. There are many contents such as Mukbang, gaming, and visible radio in streaming platforms. stream Jockey(BJ) try to make their own streams' atmosphere and sometimes it would be a new cyberculture.  Basically, communication between the streamer and real-time viewer is one of the important things in a stream. In this process, culture can be created and this immediately surfaces and quickly transmitted in Internet communities.

Internet Communities 
Internet communities can be referred as the nests of cyberculture in South Korea. Hit-cyberculture on internet communities often permeate even offline. A field of language is the most remarkable field. Internet communities lead this language trend in South Korea. Even though there are countless internet communities, there are some communities to see thoroughly. Each internet community has different interests and different people gather at different community sites. So, their atmosphere and the cyberculture that they produce and consume are different from each other.
 DC inside - DC inside has an internet community has many forums (a.k.a. gallery) for different interests. This community was organized as community of interest for cameras and sharing photographs for amateur photographers at first, but its purpose was changed to Internet community. There are forums about almost everything. People who have same interest can discuss it on DC inside. In this process, many cybercultures are produced and consumed. 
 Todayhumor - Todayhumor is a popular Korean internet forum. Originally dedicated just to humor, it has since grown to encapsulate various different topics and interests. It is widely used, ranking as the most popular Korean internet community in 2014. Its users tend to be left-leaning politically, which generates some controversy for the website during election seasons.
 Diesel Mania - Diesel Mania is an online community catering to those interested in substitution for purchasing Diesel Jean and True religion. The biggest male-fashion community in South Korea. This community has real-name policy. Because of it, this community's issues are less rather than other communities. 
These differences between communities makes cyberculture in South Korea diverse.

NAMU Wiki

History 
The Angel Halo wiki, the predecessor of the NAMU Wiki, was founded on March 1, 2007. It specialized in animation, comics, and Internet neologism. It was popular because of its unique narrative method of mixing jokes such as puns, and various people continued to write for it making it bigger. It changed its name to the Liga Vedic wiki in 2012. However, it became one of the alternative wikis forking this wiki when it became impossible to operate due to the debacle of the League Vedic wiki operator privatizing wikis, and it was made up as a separate site that backed up about 90% of the League Vedic wiki documents. After the privatization of the League Vedai Wiki, most of the League Vedic Wiki users have become NAMU Wiki and Libre Wiki users. 
As of March 13, 2017, NAMU Wiki outperformed the Korean Wikipedia in that NAMU Wiki ranked 11th on the list of popular websites in Korea while Korean Wiki ranked 33rd, and Google Search, which reflects user preferences. As causative factors of the wiki's popular, the B-list language used in the NAMU wiki was filled with jokes, such as puns, and people responded to the preference of the users who liked the flimsy stories rather than the hard explanations. Also, it is analyzed that the size of the Korean version of Wikipedia is smaller than other language versions and the lack of content makes the NAMU wiki more popular.

Meaning in Cyberculture in South Korea 
The NAMU wiki, which is popular with people because of these stimulating factors is actively participating in internet culture and events recorded on the NAMU wiki. All the materials in various fields are constantly generated in the wiki. As the characteristic of the wiki, it could be considered as Korea cyberculture storage. A lot of participants can be added and modified in one event, resulting in collective intelligence. As a result of constant user participation and the uploading of contents in various fields, the cyber history of Korea can be seen. For example, Internet culture created and consumed by streams and communities is eventually stored on a NAMU wiki.
Although due to the large number of participants, NAMU Wiki may have unverified or biased content. This may lead to arbitrary authoring, creation of untrusted sources, and so on. This is an inevitable problem that arises from the fact that the motto of NAMU Wiki is that everyone can contribute. But, this may also be resolved by a large number of steady participation. Articles that are biased or arbitrarily written are reviewed by others several times, hundreds of times, and the articles may be modified by anyone. This will fill the NAMU wiki with unambiguous descriptions and trusted sources that can be selected by anyone.

Example of Cyberculture in South Korea

A gale of bitcoin 
As bitcoin trading and virtual money trading are gaining popularity in South Korea, buzzwords related with these trading are getting popular on SNS and other communities. 
 GAZUA (가즈아) - is kind of a magic word. People say it when they want express their hope that bitcoin's price goes up to their expectation. literally it means 'Go'. People started using this word in real world.
 Jonber (존버) - word represent 'Do not sell the coin till price goes high'
 Yeongcha Yeongcha (영차영차) - The sound that many people put together to strengthen their energy. People use this word as a hope to increase price of virtual cash.

Criticism 
Many of the online security breaches in South Korea seem to stem from a common use of comparatively outdated browsers and security software.

There is occasional criticism claiming that foreign websites are significantly slower than South-Korean websites, for example websites for video streaming. This is a common problem in any country trying to communicate over foreign waters, since the latency in transcontinental communication is higher due to the physical distance that the signal has to travel.

Internet addiction
Internet addiction is very common across the world. Factors of internet addiction be anything online, whether excessively playing video games, compulsive shopping, going back and forth with social media, etc. (Gregory, 2020). Major symptoms of internet addiction consist of “depression, anxiety, isolation, avoidance of work, and some physical conditions of backache, headaches, insomnia, neck pain, etc. (Gregory, 2020, par. 4). Particularly in South Korea, almost 95% of adults own a smartphone which some experts say is becoming increasingly addicted to the Internet (Sullivan, 2019). This is because the South Korean environment allows easy access to the internet to almost any online users in the country. Any ages of Koreans can access the internet easily from one neighborhood to another. Almost 20% of the South Korea population are in major risk of internet addiction which advocates to nearly 10 million people according to a 2018 government survey.

Issues within the community
In South Korea, there are places where anyone can access the internet easily at common places known as “PC Bang” in American terms known as “PC Café”. PC Bangs are often “shiny places with big, comfy chairs, huge screens and fast Internet, all for about a dollar an hour” (Sullivan, 2019, par. 3). Most of the PC Bangs are open 24 hours a day which is a major cause to internet addiction from ages type ranging from young teenagers to adults. A PC Bang owner in Seoul's upmarket Gangnam neighborhood stated the following “some customers who play too long gets smelly, and other customers start to complain, so we have to ask them to leave” (Sullivan, 2019, par. 5). Due to major issues similarly to the owner stating above, Seoul's Hanyang University psychiatrists who studies internet addiction believes that South Korea is facing a public health crisis.

Symptoms
Although there's major disagreements whether Internet Addiction causes symptoms, “most authors agree that the preoccupation with the Internet and withdrawal symptoms (e.g., dysphoria, anxiety, irritability) when unable to access the internet must be present” (Uribe & Schub, 2018, par. 4). Just like many common addictions, symptoms occur whether its alcohol, drugs, gambling, shopping, and many more. Every addiction is unique from one another due to its nature of addiction but behind the addiction are almost too similar due to what it is doing with the brain controlling and manipulating the human to do a certain act based on the type of addiction.

Other symptoms of internet addiction can consist “development of tolerance, repeated inability to cut back on Internet use, disregard for the consequences (physical, psychological, and/or social) of overuse, loss of interest in other activities in favor of Internet use, and Internet use as a means of escape or mood elevation (Tao et al., 2010)” (Uribe & Schub, 2018, par. 4). Just like all addictions, there are treatments that are created to treat and solve an addiction.

Outlook & treatments
Some ways that internet addiction can be solved especially for younger children is for parents to be more proactive when letting children having access to the internet on the daily as well as the number of devices. Parents are critical when it comes to children being addicted to the internet due to the responsibilities it has on the daily usage of internet (Young & Nabuco 2017, p. 155).

In South Korea, there are "regional education offices that provide services such as in-school counseling, screening surveys, preventive disciplines and, for severe cases, addiction camp" (Sullivan, 2019, par. 10). The South Korean government provides and finances most of the camps through the national or municipal levels, which has been for more than a decade.

The internet addiction camp is a place “where people can go to receive help for the unhealthy relationship that they have with the internet” (Newsround, 2019, par. 3). Its purpose is to support those who are in need by becoming more independent from the internet and depict their views when using the internet. The rules are very strict as it does not allow phones and any devices are must be given to the instructors immediately especially like hair straighteners. Its goal is to help the people to find ways to be happier when doing other types of activities like craft sessions, games and activities rather than using the internet. Over 1,200 young people have attended the internet addiction camp since 2014.

See also
Internet censorship in South Korea
Net neutrality
Digital divide in South Korea

References

31. Gregory, C. (2020, November 11). Internet Addiction Disorder. Psycom. https://www.psycom.net/iadcriteria.html
32. South Korean internet addiction camp: What is life like there? (2019, July 8). BBC NewsRound. https://www.bbc.co.uk/newsround/48855182
33. Sullivan, M. (2019, August 13). Hooked on the Internet, South Korean Teens Go Into Digital Box. NPR. https://www.npr.org/2019/08/13/748299817/hooked-on-the-internet-south-korean-teens-go-into-digital-detox
34. Nabuco, C. & Young, K. (2017). Internet Addiction in Children and Adolescents: Risk Factors, Assessment, and Treatment. Springer Publishing Company.
35. Uribe, LM., & Schub, T. (2018, September 28). Internet Addiction. CINAHL Nursing Guide EBSCO Publishing.

Further reading